The following Confederate States Army units and commanders fought in the Battle of Darbytown and New Market Roads on October 7, 1864. The Union order of battle is listed separately.

Abbreviations used

Military rank
 Gen = General
 LTG = Lieutenant General
 MG = Major General
 BG = Brigadier General
 Col = Colonel

Other
 (w) = wounded
 (mw) = mortally wounded
 (k) = killed in action
 (c) = captured

Army of Northern Virginia

First Corps

LTG James Longstreet

Fourth Corps

LTG Richard H. Anderson

Cavalry Corps

LTG Wade Hampton

American Civil War orders of battle